Mount Hope College was a college located along the outer limits of Baltimore, Maryland.  The first president of the institution was Frederick Hall, a Presbyterian clergyman who had previously operated a school at the same location. It operated from 1833 until 1844.

Footnotes 

Educational institutions established in 1833
Defunct private universities and colleges in Maryland
1844 disestablishments in Maryland
1833 establishments in Maryland
Educational institutions disestablished in 1844
Universities and colleges in Baltimore